Trofeo Colombino was a summer football tournament hosted annually by Recreativo de Huelva at their home ground Nuevo Colombino in Huelva, Spain. The tournament is held in honor of Recre's position as the oldest surviving Spanish football club and has been held since 1965. Recreativo itself has won the most times; the current champion is Recreativo de Huelva.

Champions

References
  Historial: Resultados y Clasificaciones del Trofeo Colombino recreativohuelva.com
  Carabela de felicidad Diario Huelva Información

Recurring sporting events established in 1965
Spanish football friendly trophies
Recreativo de Huelva
1965 establishments in Spain
Sport in Huelva